Mid Kent was a county constituency in the county of Kent, which returned one Member of Parliament (MP)  to the House of Commons of the Parliament of the United Kingdom.

It was created for the 1983 general election from parts of the seats of Rochester and Chatham & Maidstone, and abolished for the 1997 general election.

A previous two-member constituency called Mid Kent existed from 1868 to 1885.

Boundaries 
The City of Rochester-upon-Medway wards of Holcombe, Horsted, Lordswood, Luton, Walderslade, Wayfield, and Weedswood, and the Borough of Maidstone wards of Bearsted, Boxley, Detling, East, Harrietsham and Lenham, Hollingbourne, North, and Thurnham.

The constituency was predominantly rural between the urban areas of Medway and Maidstone.

Members of Parliament

Election results

Elections in the 1980s

Elections in the 1990s

Notes and references 

Politics of Swale
Parliamentary constituencies in Kent (historic)
Constituencies of the Parliament of the United Kingdom established in 1983
Constituencies of the Parliament of the United Kingdom disestablished in 1997